Watusi is a studio album by The Wedding Present. It was released in 1994 on Island Records. It peaked at No. 47 on the UK Albums chart.

Watusi was re-issued by Edsel Records in 2014; the band played the album in its entirety during their autumn 2014 UK tour.

Production
The album was produced by Steve Fisk. Beat Happening's Heather Lewis guested on two tracks.

Critical reception
Trouser Press wrote: "Frequently slow and spare, letting small-scale instrumental restraint release Gedge’s most luminous melodies and performances, the album is a surprising charmer — except in the lyrics of songs that shrug off guilt while acknowledging its validity." Clash deemed it "a curiously 1960s-flecked, garage-pop album." Spin called Watusi "a dream-pop album that obsesses instead of dreams."

Track listing
 "So Long, Baby" – 2:28
 "Click Click" – 4:28
 "Yeah Yeah Yeah Yeah Yeah" – 3:15
 "Let Him Have It" – 3:01
 "Gazebo" – 3:08
 "Shake It" – 3:03
 "Spangle" – 3:15
 "It's a Gas" – 3:31
 "Swimming Pools, Movie Stars" – 3:09
 "Big Rat" – 3:39
 "Catwoman" - 7:09
 "Hot Pants" - 2:03

All songs written by Belk/Dorrington/Gedge/Smith, except tracks 1 and 11 written by Belk/Dorrington/Gedge/Gregory/Smith and track 4 written by Dorrington/Gedge/Gregory/Smith.

Personnel
The Wedding Present
David Gedge - vocals, guitar
Paul Dorrington - guitar
Darren Belk - bass, "Shake It" vocals
Simon Smith - drums
Additional musicians
Carrie Akre - extra vocals [tracks 5 & 8]
Heather Lewis - extra vocals [tracks 2 & 9]
Greg Powers - trombone
Steve Fisk - piano, organ, guitar

References

 Watusi compact disc sleeves notes.

The Wedding Present albums
1994 albums
Albums produced by Steve Fisk
Island Records albums